Five ships of the Royal Navy have borne the name HMS Terpsichore, after Terpsichore, one of the Muses of Greek mythology:
  was a 24-gun sixth rate captured from the French in 1760 and sold in 1766.
  was a 32-gun fifth rate launched in 1785. She was used as a receiving ship from 1818 and was broken up in 1830.
  was an 18-gun sloop launched in 1847. She was sunk in torpedo trials in 1865, and was raised and broken up in 1866.
  was an  protected cruiser launched in 1890 and sold in 1914.
  was a T-class destroyer launched in 1943. She was converted into a Type 16 frigate between 1952 and 1955, and was broken up in 1966.

See also 
 

Royal Navy ship names